This article is a list of railway stations in Indonesia. The stations are operated by Indonesia's national rail operator, Kereta Api Indonesia.

Jakarta

Banten

West Java

Central Java

Special Region of Yogyakarta

East Java

Aceh

North Sumatra

West Sumatra

Bengkulu

South Sumatra

Lampung

South Sulawesi

References 

Railway stations
Indonesia
Railway stations